Vranduk may refer to the following places in Bosnia and Herzegovina:
 Vranduk (Doboj)
 Vranduk (Zenica)